Dayton Wire Wheels are a brand of wheels made for cars and trucks. The company was founded in 1916 and was used by the Wright Brothers, Henry Ford, and Charles Lindbergh.

It is also known as Dayton rim or Dayton wheel. Example of Dayton wired wheel is the Jaguar XJ6

External links
Official website

Auto parts suppliers of the United States
Wheel manufacturers
Companies based in Dayton, Ohio
Manufacturing companies based in Ohio
American brands